Sarah Joanna Tabrizi FMedSci is a British neurologist and neuroscientist in the field of neurodegeneration, particularly Huntington's disease. She is a Professor and Joint Head of the Department of Neurodegenerative Diseases at the UCL Institute of Neurology; the founder and Director of the UCL Huntington's Disease Centre; a Principal Investigator at the UK Dementia Research Institute at UCL; and an Honorary Consultant Neurologist at the National Hospital for Neurology and Neurosurgery, Queen Square, London, where she established the Multidisciplinary Huntington's Disease Clinic. The UCL Huntington’s Disease Centre was officially opened on 1 March 2017 by UCL President and Provost Professor Michael Arthur.

Education and career 

Tabrizi graduated with a first-class degree in biochemistry from Heriot-Watt University in 1986 and an MB ChB from the University of Edinburgh in 1992, where she graduated with the Gold Medal (Ettles Scholar) for the most distinguished medical graduate. She obtained a PhD at University College London in 2000. During her time as a trainee neurologist at the National Hospital for Neurology and Neurosurgery (NHNN), Queen Square, Sarah worked for Professors Anita Harding and David Marsden, both of whom would make a lasting impression on her. She undertook an MRC Clinical Training Fellowship PhD studying mitochondrial dysfunction in neurodegeneration with Tony Schapira and Gillian Bates from 1996 to 1999 then obtained a Department of Health National Clinician Scientist Fellowship at the UCL Institute of Neurology in 2002 to work with John Collinge and Charles Weissmann on prion cell biology. She was promoted to UCL Clinical Senior Lecturer and Honorary Consultant Neurologist in 2003, to Reader in 2007 and Full Professor in 2009.

Research 

Tabrizi is distinguished for her work on mechanisms of cellular neurodegeneration and in particular Huntington's disease mechanistic pathobiology, novel therapeutics, biomarkers, outcome measures and first in human clinical trials.  Amongst her achievements, she has identified key pathogenic mechanisms in cellular degeneration in prion disease, identified a key role for the innate immune system in the pathogenesis of Huntington’s disease, published the first assay of the mutant HD protein in human blood cells, and designed and led two major, international, influential research initiatives, TRACK-HD and Track-On HD. To date these studies have yielded fundamental new insights into the preclinical phase of neurodegeneration in Huntington’s disease including identifying predictors of disease onset, progression, evidence of brain compensation and plasticity and neurobiological changes occurring twenty years before predicted disease onset, and her work established a battery of clinical trial outcome measures. Alongside colleagues at the HD Regulatory Science Consortium and CHDI, Tabrizi developed a novel staging framework, the Huntington’s Disease Integrated Staging System (HD-ISS), that assesses the progression of disease from birth. Similar to the cancer staging system, the HD-ISS defines HD in four stages, from 0-3, and also biologically defines the disease as the presence of the HTT CAG repeat mutation. This will allow clinical trials much earlier in course of the disease process, and well in advance of when people show signs and symptoms of the disease, allowing the possibility of disease prevention in the future. Recently her work identified an important new genetic modifier of disease progression in Huntington’s disease, which has opened up new avenues of research into targeting DNA repair pathways as possible therapeutics for Huntington’s disease.

Tabrizi gave a keynote presentation at the 2016 Google Zeitgeist Minds conference about the trial, and the prospect of gene silencing for neurodegenerative disease. She was the lead Clinical Investigator for the first clinical trial of a 'gene silencing' or huntingtin-lowering antisense oligonucleotide (ASO) drug in Huntington's disease patients. The announcement of the ‘top line’ results from the Phase 1b/2a safety trial in December 2017 received widespread national and international media coverage and was covered in features by BBC News, Guardian and Nature. In May 2019 the full results were published in The New England Journal of Medicine.

The potential of antisense oligonucleotides to treat neurodegenerative diseases was reviewed by Tabrizi in Science in 2020. Tabrizi is currently working on several different approaches to treat Huntington’s disease, including testing novel ASOs targeting mismatch repair to slow CAG repeat expansion and new gene therapy approaches targeting the mutant HD gene. More recently Tabrizi published the Huntington’s Disease Young Adult Study (HD-YAS) studying premanifest HD gene carriers approximately 24 years from predicted onset of clinical symptoms using advanced neuroimaging, detailed cognitive testing and biofluid collection. The cohort did not show any clinically meaningful functional impairment, yet there was evidence of elevated levels of neurofilament light protein, suggestive of very early neuronal damage, in those closest to expected symptom onset. HD-YAS will provide critical information on the very earliest signs of neurodegeneration, identifying a time at which a therapy could potentially be introduced to delay or even ultimately prevent the onset of clinical symptoms in HD. This approach has implications beyond HD, providing a model for disease prevention in neurodegeneration and this work continues to be of major interest in the Tabrizi lab.

Tabrizi was the subject of profile articles in The Lancet in 2012 and The Lancet Neurology in 2017.

As of November 2022, Tabrizi had authored over 360 publications, with over 32,000 citations for her research.

Awards and honours 

 MRC Millennium Medal (2022).
 Huntington’s Disease Society of America Outstanding Research Award (2022).
 Osler Medal and Lecture from the Association of Physicians of Great Britain and Ireland (2022).
 Alexander Morison Medal from the Royal College of Physicians of Edinburgh (2019).
Yahr Award from the World Congress of Neurology (2019).
Cotzias Award from the Spanish Society of Neurology (2018).
NHS70 Women Leader award (2018).
Seventh Leslie Gehry Brenner Prize for Innovation in Science awarded by the Hereditary Disease Foundation (2017).
 Elected Fellow of the Academy of Medical Sciences (2014).
 Member of the Wellcome Trust Expert Review Group on Cellular and Molecular Neuroscience (2013-2017).
 Associate editor, Journal of Huntington's Disease.
 Elected Fellow of the Royal College of Physicians (2007).

Personal life 
Tabrizi lives in London with her husband, the author Michael Nath.

References

External links 

 UCL Huntington's Disease Centre
 Google Scholar Citations - Sarah J Tabrizi
 Sarah Tabrizi profile at UCL Iris

1965 births
20th-century British biologists
20th-century British women scientists
21st-century British biologists
21st-century British women scientists
Alumni of Heriot-Watt University
Alumni of University College London
Alumni of the University of Edinburgh
Academics of University College London
British neurologists
British neuroscientists
British women neuroscientists
British women biologists
British people of Iranian descent
Fellows of the Academy of Medical Sciences (United Kingdom)
Huntington's disease
Living people